The following is a list of episodes for the British sitcom Porridge and sequel series, Going Straight, which aired on BBC 1 from 5 September 1974 to 25 March 1977 and 24 February to 7 April 1978 respectively. A further sequel series following the grandson of Fletcher, Porridge, aired in 2016 and 2017.

Series overview

Porridge

Series 1 (1973–74)

Series 2 (1975–76)

Series 3 (1977)

Going Straight

Series 1 (1978)

Porridge feature film (1979)

Life Beyond the Box: Norman Stanley Fletcher (2003)

Porridge (2016)

Series 1 (2016-17)

References

External links
 BBC list of Porridge episodes

.

BBC-related lists
Lists of British sitcom episodes